Marie-Louise Bévis (born 12 October 1972 in Morne-à-l'Eau, Guadeloupe) is a retired French sprinter who specialized in the 400 metres.

She finished fifth at the 1995 World Indoor Championships, won the gold medal at the 1997 Jeux de la Francophonie, and the gold medal at the 2001 Mediterranean Games. She also competed at the 2000 European Indoor Championships without reaching the final.

In the 4 × 400 metres relay she finished sixth at the 1993 World Championships, and fifth at the 2002 European Championships. She also competed at the 1995 World Championships and the 2003 World Championships.

Her personal best times are 11.89 seconds in the 100 metres, achieved in September 2003 in Saint-Florentin; 23.95 seconds in the 200 metres, achieved in May 2002 in Lisbon; and 52.06 seconds in the 400 metres, achieved in June 2003 in Nogent-sur-Marne.

References

1972 births
Living people
French female sprinters
Guadeloupean female sprinters
French people of Guadeloupean descent
Mediterranean Games gold medalists for France
Mediterranean Games medalists in athletics
Athletes (track and field) at the 2001 Mediterranean Games